Red Shadows is a collection of Fantasy short stories and poems by Robert E. Howard.  It was first published in 1968 by Donald M. Grant, Publisher, Inc. in an edition of 896 copies.  The stories and poems feature Howard's character, Solomon Kane.  Many of the stories first appeared in the magazine Weird Tales.

Contents
 "Skulls in the Stars"
 "The Right Hand of Doom"
 "Red Shadows"
 "Rattle of Bones"
 "The Castle of the Devil"
 "The Moon of Skulls"
 "The One Black Stain"
 "Blades of the Brotherhood"
 "The Hills of the Dead"
 "Hawk of Basti"
 "The Return of Sir Richard Grenville"
 "Wings in the Night"
 "The Footfalls Within"
 "The Children of Asshur"
 "Solomon Kane’s Homecoming"

Publication history

References

External links

The Solomon Kane Chronology
Poetry Reading: The Savage Tales of Solomon Kane
 
 
 

1968 short story collections
Short story collections by Robert E. Howard
Donald M. Grant, Publisher books
Fantasy short story collections